Sugar daddy commonly refers to:

 Sugar Daddy (candy), a caramel lollipop
 Sugar daddy (slang term), a man who offers support (typically financial and material) to a younger companion

Sugar daddy or sugar daddies may also refer to:

Music 
 Sugardaddy (duo), a British music duo
 Sugar Daddy Live, a 2011 live album by the Melvin's
 "Sugar Daddy" (The Bellamy Brothers song), 1980 
 "Sugar Daddy" (The Jackson 5 song), 1971 
 "Sugar Daddy" (Thompson Twins song), 1989
 "Sugar Daddy", a song from the 1998 musical and 2001 film Hedwig and the Angry Inch
 "Sugar Daddy", a song by D'Angelo from the 2014 album Black Messiah
 "Sugar Daddy", a song by Fleetwood Mac from the 1975 album Fleetwood Mac
 "Sugar Daddy", a song by Laika from the 1994 album Silver Apples of the Moon
 "Sugar Daddy" (Macy Gray song), a song by Macy Gray from the 2018 album Ruby
 "Sugar Daddy", a song by Mýa from the 2008 album Sugar & Spice
 "Sugar Daddy", a song by Qveen Herby from the 2020 EP 8
 "Sugar Daddy", a song by Richie Sambora from the 2012 album Aftermath of the Lowdown
 "Sugar Daddy", a song by The Badloves from the 1993 album Get on Board

Other uses 
 Sugar Daddies,  a 1927 Laurel & Hardy film
 Sugar Daddies (play), by Alan Ayckbourn, 2003
 Sugar Daddy, a 2007 novel by Lisa Kleypas
 "Sugar Daddy" (Ugly Betty), a 2009 episode of the TV drama
 "Sugar Daddy", a 2017 episode of Black-ish
 Sugar Daddy (film), a 2020 Canadian drama film

See also 

 Sugar Baby (disambiguation)
 Sugar Man (disambiguation)